Stephen Amoah (popularly known as Sticka) is a Ghanaian politician who is a member of the New Patriotic Party (NPP). He is the member of parliament for the Nhyiaeso Constituency. He is currently a board member of GCB Bank.

Early life and education 
Stephen Amoah was born on 27 March 1970. He hails from Kronum Afrancho in the Ashanti Region of Ghana. He completed Opoku Ware School, Kumasi. He holds a Master of Science degree in Strategic Finance Management from University of Derby, United Kingdom in 2007. He also had his Bachelor of Science Degree in Computer Science from the Kwame Nkrumah University of Science and Technology (KNUST), Ghana. He also has a Certificate in Entrepreneurship from MIT. He also holds a PhD in Actuarial Science from KNUST.

Career 
Amoah was the Chief Finance Officer of Kencity and also served in the past as the Deputy National Coordinator of the National Insurance Authority (NHIA). In February 2017, He was appointed by President Akufo-Addo as the chief executive officer for  the Microfinance and Small Loans Centre (MASLOC). He is the CEO of Zintex Portfolio Services Limited. He is a finance and investment consultant.

Football team 
In August 2022, Amoah established the Kumasi FC which is a football club in Kumasi specifically Nhyiaeso. It is a football academy with training center, gymnasium, medical center and other facilities.

Politics 
Amoah stood for the NPP primaries in ahead of the 2020 elections. In June 2020 he won the primaries for the Nhyiaeso Constituency after defeating incumbent member of parliament Kennedy Kwasi Kankam  who had unseated Richard Winfred Anane in 2016 NPP primaries.

He won by garnering 332 votes while the incumbent had 315 votes out of the 647 total vote cast.

Amoah was elected member of parliament for Nhyaieso in the 2020 December parliamentary elections. He won the seat after getting 51,531 votes representing 81.71% against his closest contender Richard Kwamina Prah of the National Democratic Congress who had 11,033 votes representing 17.49%.

Committees 
Amoah is a member of the Finance Committee and also a member of the Privileges Committee.

Personal life 
Amoah is a Christian.

Philanthropy 
In April 2022, Amoah presented printers, computers and over thousand desks to schools in the Nhyiaeso Constituency.

Controversy 
In December 2021, the La Magistrate Court issued a bench warrants for the arrest of Amoah and Samuel Anim for their refusal to appear before court for road traffic offenses. He later appeared before the court after presenting himself to the GPS.

References 

Living people
New Patriotic Party politicians
Kwame Nkrumah University of Science and Technology alumni
Alumni of Opoku Ware School
Alumni of the University of Derby
Ghanaian MPs 2021–2025
1970 births